Marian Jerzy Woronin (born 13 August 1956 in Grodzisk Mazowiecki) is a retired Polish athlete who competed mainly in the 100 metres. He is a four-time European Indoor Champion in the 60 metres. He won nine Polish outdoor titles, and nine indoor titles.

His first major medal came at the 1978 European Athletics Championships, where he anchored the Polish 4×100 metres relay team of Zenon Nowosz, Zenon Licznerski and Leszek Dunecki to the gold medal in the event. He won the bronze in the 100 m at the 1979 IAAF World Cup, running for Europe.

He competed for Poland in the 1980 Summer Olympics held in Moscow, Soviet Union in the 100 and 200 he reached both finals finishing seventh in both sprints. In the 4×100 metres relay he won the silver medal with his teammates Krzysztof Zwoliński, Licznerski and Dunecki.

In 1981 he ran with the Polish/Europe sprint relay team that won the gold at the 1981 IAAF World Cup in Rome. He won a bronze in the 100 metres at the 1982 European Athletics Championships.

His fastest time for the 100 m was 10.00 seconds, recorded in 1984 in Warsaw with wind on the maximum allowable limit of 2.0 m/s. This was the European record for the event until Linford Christie ran 9.97 sec at the 1988 Seoul Olympics. Although Woronin's official timing read as 10.00 seconds, this was rounded up from 9.992 seconds – so this represents the first time that a Caucasian (and a European) broke the 10-second barrier in this event, albeit unofficially.

Woronin's personal best in the 200 m was 20.49.

Competition record

1Representing Europe

References

External links

 

1956 births
Polish male sprinters
Athletes (track and field) at the 1976 Summer Olympics
Athletes (track and field) at the 1980 Summer Olympics
Olympic athletes of Poland
Olympic silver medalists for Poland
Living people
People from Grodzisk Mazowiecki
European Athletics Championships medalists
World Athletics Championships athletes for Poland
Sportspeople from Masovian Voivodeship
Medalists at the 1980 Summer Olympics
Olympic silver medalists in athletics (track and field)
Legia Warsaw athletes
Friendship Games medalists in athletics